Louis Philipps (born 29 April 1904, date of death unknown) was a French middle-distance runner. He competed in the men's 800 metres at the 1924 Summer Olympics.

References

External links
 

1904 births
Year of death missing
Athletes (track and field) at the 1924 Summer Olympics
French male middle-distance runners
Olympic athletes of France
Place of birth missing